Oxford United may refer to:

 Oxford United F.C., an English men’s association football club
 Oxford United Ladies F.C., an English women’s association football club
 Oxford United Stars F.C., a Northern Irish men's association football club in the Intermediate League 
 Oxford Sunnyside F.C., an association football club in the Mid-Ulster Football League formerly used the name Oxford United F.C.